William John Hayes, also referred to as Willie Hayes or Billy Hayes, (30 March 1928 – August 2014) was an Irish footballer who played as a goalkeeper for Limerick, Torquay United, Ellesmere Port and Wrexham.

As an international, Hayes also played for Ireland. Hayes was 21 when he made his one and only appearance for Ireland on 24 April 1949 in a 2–0 defeat to Belgium at Dalymount Park. His teammates on the day included Johnny Carey, Con Martin, Billy Walsh, Jackie O'Driscoll and Paddy Coad. Although a goalkeeper he was only 5 ft 9 inches tall. Another William Hayes also played for Ireland during the 1940s.

References

1928 births
2014 deaths
Association footballers from County Limerick
Association football goalkeepers
Republic of Ireland association footballers
Ireland (FAI) international footballers
Limerick F.C. players
Wrexham A.F.C. players
Ellesmere Port Town F.C. players
Torquay United F.C. players
League of Ireland players
English Football League players